iSheep is a derogatory term used to refer to people who like all products and services distributed by Apple Inc. The term is usually applied online by Android fans in online tech forums and social media. The use of the term often comes out of a stereotype that Apple users and fans are less intelligent than Android users and/or tend to have less knowledge about technology in general.
iSheep was originally a SanDisk marketing description of users of iPod music player instead of SanDisk's own Sansa player. 

The marketing term is borrowed by some in technology sites and Internet forums as an insult to a person or a group of people who is a fan of all Apple products, especially those who tend to purchase products from the brand not regarding its actual value or functionality, but the brand name, logo and the status symbol associated with it.

History

Origins 
The term was introduced in May 2006 when SanDisk launched the "iDon’t" campaign to advertise the SanDisk Sansa. iDon't calls on "free thinkers" to "break-free from restrictive formats and a single source for music," with slogans such as "You do not need to follow." The Campaign's site offered T-shirts, posters, and stickers featuring a monkey and asking, "Are you an iChimp?" Another image showed a sheep and says, "iSheep say Baah." while another showed a donkey trying to bite a carrot dangling in front of its face with the slogan "iFollow."

The iSheep campaign was abandoned in July 2006, to give way to the "Lil'Monsta" mascot campaign.

Meaning and use 
A common defining characteristic of "iSheep" is the "entitlement to Apple products and self-declared superiority of Apple products in general, without objective evidence supporting the claim."

A common behavior of “iSheep” is labeling new features and capabilities of products of competitors (e.g. Galaxy S4 in 2013) as superfluous or feature creep and flooding online forums with their criticism, while labelling similar features on Apple devices as innovative, which is a form of double standard. One example is the Galaxy S4's “dual camera” mode, which allowed capturing photos and videos from both cameras simultaneously, which was labelled “feature creep” by forum users.

More examples include fast charging which was featured in Samsung Galaxy Note 4 (2014), wireless charging in Galaxy S3 (2012), multi-camera systems in HTC One M7, LG G3, Huawei P20 Pro, Huawei Mate 9, AR camera in Sony Xperia Z2 (2014), water resistance in Xperia V (2012), Galaxy S4 active (2013), Galaxy S5 (2014),  Galaxy S7 (2016), 1080p front-camera video recording in Galaxy S4 (2013) and 2160p video recording in Galaxy Note 3 (2013), all of which were features Android-based mobile phones had years ahead of iPhones, which were labelled as unneeded and/or superfluous by critics on forums and social media by the same people that would consider it as innovative when Apple introduced the feature on their mobile phones years later.

In addition, Air View on the Galaxy S4 (released early 2013) was often mentioned in essay articles that labelled it as feature creep.
Unlike “Air View”, the similar 3D touch feature on iPhones since 6s (late 2015) is not known to be repeatedly labelled as “feature creep” by critics.

The term carries a lot of stereotypes, like "the same Apple iPhone users who earlier stated the slim build of Apple iPhones as a reason for purchase (e.g., iPhone 6, iPhone 6s), purchase the iPhone 11 despite of its 8.3mm thickness," which means that the thickness suddenly does not matter for iSheep when Apple made a mobile phone thicker than usual.

Other stereotypes include iSheep being full of beliefs with "cognitive dissonance, classism and toxic fandom."

References 

Apple Inc.
Fandom
SanDisk
Advertising campaigns